Bracken Nature Reserve is a  piece of protected land in Brackenfell in the Western  Cape, South Africa.

This park preserves badly threatened Cape Flats Sand Fynbos and Swartland Granite Renosterveld vegetation. A diverse array of orchids, succulents and flowering bulbs are among the over 160 plant species that occur here. Of these, ten occur only within the City of Cape Town and are in serious danger of extinction, including Antimima aristulata, cowslip (Lachenalia aloides), canary yellow vygie (Lampranthus glaucus) and carrion flower (Orbea variegate).
The park is also home to a variety of small mammals, reptiles and amphibians, as well as range of bird species.

There is an indigenous garden at the entrance, and footpaths that take visitors past birdlife and views of the surrounding countryside. The reserve is situated on top of an old quarry and landfill site so gas extraction pipes have had to be installed, to let the excess gases from the decomposing waste escape.

See also
 Biodiversity of Cape Town
 Cape Flats Sand Fynbos
 List of nature reserves in Cape Town
 Renosterveld

References

Nature reserves in Cape Town
Protected areas of the Western Cape
Fynbos